Italy competed at the 1912 Summer Olympics in Stockholm, Sweden.

Medalists

Aquatics

Diving

A single diver represented Italy. It was Italy's second appearance in diving, with Carlo Bonfanti being the nation's only diver both in 1912 and 1908. Bonfanti did not reach the final in either of his two events.

Rankings given are within the diver's heat.

Swimming

Two swimmers competed for Italy at the 1912 Games. It was the third time the nation appeared in swimming, and both swimmers had previously competed in 1908.

Neither Massa nor Baiardo was able to advance to an event final. Massa's second-place finish in his initial heat of the 100 metre freestyle was the only race in which either was not eliminated. Massa did not appear for his quarterfinal race, but was allowed to compete in the semifinals.

Ranks given for each swimmer are within the heat.

 Men

Athletics

14 athletes represented Italy. It was the nation's third appearance in athletics. Fernando Altimani's bronze medal in the 10 kilometre racewalk was Italy's best result and only medal in the sport.

Ranks given are within that athlete's heat for running events.

Fencing

Nine fencers represented Italy. It was the third appearance of the nation in fencing. Italy's foilists did well, taking the gold and silver medals as well as having a third finalist. The medals were Italy's first in individual amateur events. Nedo Nadi, the gold medalist in the foil, was also the only non-Hungarian to reach the final in the sabre, placing fifth.

Football

 Team Roster
Edoardo Mariani
Enrico Sardi
Felice Berardo
Franco Bontadini
Enea Zuffi
Pietro Leone
Giuseppe Milano
Carlo De Marchi
Renzo De Vecchi
Angelo Binaschi
Piero Campelli
Luigi Barbesino
Modesto Valle
Vittorio Morelli Di Popolo

 Results

First round

Consolation quarterfinals

Consolation semifinals

Final rank 7th place

Gymnastics

Eighteen gymnasts represented Italy. It was the third appearance of the nation in gymnastics. Italy entered six gymnasts in the individual competition, winning the gold and bronze medals and having all six gymnasts place in the top ten. Alberto Braglia, the defending Olympic champion, was the individual champion again. The Italian team also entered one of the three team competitions to win their second gymnastics gold of 1912.

Artistic

Wrestling

Greco-Roman

Italy was represented by six wrestlers in its second Olympic wrestling appearance. None of the six advanced past the fourth round, as the team compiled a combined record of 8-12.

External links
 Italy at the 1912 Stockholm Summer Games
Official Olympic Reports
International Olympic Committee results database
 

Nations at the 1912 Summer Olympics
1912
Olympics